"Slave to the Rhythm" is a 1985 song written by Trevor Horn, Bruce Woolley, Stephen Lipson, and Simon Darlow, and performed by Jamaican-American singer Grace Jones. It was taken from Jones' seventh album of the same name (1985), on which it is retitled "Ladies and Gentlemen: Miss Grace Jones".

Background
"Slave to the Rhythm" was the first single from Grace Jones' album of the same name, which was released in 1985. The song and the album were written by Bruce Woolley, Simon Darlow, Stephen Lipson and Trevor Horn, and was produced by Horn. This was Jones' first album in three years, and it contained eight variations of the same song (the single's B-side is another variation, yet to be released on CD). "Slave to the Rhythm" was originally intended for Frankie Goes to Hollywood as a follow-up to their hit debut single "Relax". A demo version of the song was recorded by the band. The song was assembled and produced by Horn after "Two Tribes", but the project was ultimately given to Jones. Paul Morley says Horn worked on the song endlessly and had hoped it would become one of his biggest and most successful creations.

"Slave to the Rhythm" was released in autumn 1985. The single became one of Jones' greatest commercial successes and is considered to be one of her signature tunes. It became one of the biggest chart successes for the singer in the UK (number 12, next to "Pull Up to the Bumper"). The track proved exceptionally popular in Belgium, New Zealand, Italy and German speaking countries, where it made it to the top 10. The original version of the single, and its remixes, also topped the American dance chart in February 1986, despite not entering the mainstream Billboard Hot 100 ranking. "Slave to the Rhythm" was proclaimed the best single of 1985 by The Face magazine. In 1994 a newly remixed version of the song reached the top 40 in the UK charts.

The hit single version of the song is in fact confusingly re-titled "Ladies and Gentlemen: Miss Grace Jones" on the Slave to the Rhythm album. The track "Slave to the Rhythm" on the album is in turn an entirely different interpretation of the song—a fact which apparently eluded Universal Music when they included this version in one of their many best-of packages The Ultimate Collection.

In 2012, Jones performed the song at Queen Elizabeth II's Diamond Jubilee Concert in which she hula-hooped for the entire song.

In 2022, Toyah Wilcox, Robert Fripp and Simon Darlow performed “Slave to the Rhythm” as part of “Toyah and Robert’s Sunday Lunch” in which Toyah provided the vocals and Fripp and Darlow played the guitars.

Music video
The music video for "Slave to the Rhythm" features the hit single version of the song, billed as "Ladies and Gentlemen: Miss Grace Jones" in the album track listing. It largely consists of previously seen footage, using excerpts from Jones' previously released music videos, "My Jamaican Guy" and "Living My Life", as well as the live concert performance video A One Man Show. Included are also still pictures of some of the singer's most iconic looks and the Citroën CX TV advertisement. No new footage of Jones herself was filmed for the video, which features a spoken voice-over from actor Ian McShane, extracted from tracks "Jones the Rhythm" and "Operattack". The video, of which there are several versions, was directed by Jean-Paul Goude, Jones' boyfriend at the time.

The video was nominated for the Best Female Video at 1986 MTV Video Music Awards, eventually losing to Whitney Houston's "How Will I Know". It was included as a bonus on the re-release of the A One Man Show video.

The video starts with dialogue from Ian McShane and shows how the cover art of Slave to the Rhythm was made, a before and after of the cover art image, then it shows a series of clips from archived music videos including "My Jamaican Guy", "I've Seen That Face Before (Libertango)" and the suicide scene from "Living My Life" edited to towards the end to when Jones collapsed and dies.

Track listing

7" single (1985)
A. "Slave to the Rhythm" – 4:20
B. "G.I. Blues" – 3:37

12" single (1985)
A. "Slave to the Rhythm" (Blooded) – 8:26
B1. "Junk Yard" – 5:17
B2. "Annihilated Rhythm" – 3:37

CD maxi single (1994)
 "Slave to the Rhythm" – 4:22
 "Slave to the Rhythm" (Blooded) – 8:26
 "Slave to the Rhythm" (D Monster Mix) – 9:51
 "Slave to the Rhythm" (D's Vocal Dub) – 5:24
 "Slave to the Rhythm" (D Beatsappella) – 5:22

Personnel 

 Grace Jones – lead vocals
 Tessa Niles - backing vocals
 Ambrosian Singers - choir
 J.J. Belle – rhythm guitar
 Luis Jardim - bass guitar
 Stephen Lipson – lead guitar, bass, keyboards
 Andy Richards, Bruce Woolley – keyboards 
 William "Ju Ju" House – drums
 The Little Beats, "Shorty" Tim – percussion
 Frank Ricotti – percussion
 John Thirkell – trumpet 
 Guy Barker  – trumpet
 Pete Beachill – trombone
 Dave Bishop – tenor saxophone
 David Snell – harp
 John McCarthy – conductor, choir, chorus
 Ronja Andersen - little sister to Grace Jones

Charts

Weekly charts

Year-end charts

References

1985 singles
Grace Jones songs
Shirley Bassey songs
Song recordings produced by Trevor Horn
Songs written by Bruce Woolley
Songs written by Stephen Lipson
Songs written by Trevor Horn
Songs written by Simon Darlow
1985 songs
Island Records singles